Michael Dennis Saleebey (August 29, 1936 – July 16, 2014) was an American academic credited with codifying and promoting the social work practice of Strength Based Practice during his time at the University of Kansas. He was Emeritus Professor of Social Welfare there at the School of Social Welfare.

Personal life
He was the partner of Ann Weick who also developed the strength-based theory at the University of Kansas.

Books
Saleebey's books include:
Transcultural Perspectives in the Human Services: Organizational Issues and Trends (Springfield: Charles C. Thomas, 1983, with Roosevelt Wright Jr., Thomas D. Watts, and Pedro J. Lecca)
The Strengths Perspective in Social Work Practice (New York: Longman, 1992, edited; 6th ed., 2013)
Human Behavior and Social Environments: A Biopsychosocial Approach (Columbia University Press 2001)

References

External links
 The Strengths Perspective In Social Work Practice - Google Books

 S is for Dennis Saleebey: Focusing On Strengths in Social Work

Social care in the United States
1936 births
2014 deaths
University of Kansas faculty
Place of birth missing